The Canadian diaspora is the group of Canadians living outside the borders of Canada.  As of a 2010 report by the Asia Pacific Foundation of Canada and The Canadian Expat Association, there were 2.8 million Canadian citizens abroad (plus an unknown number of former citizens and descendants of citizens).  For comparison, that is a larger population than six of the ten Canadian provinces.  More than 9% of all Canadian citizens live outside of Canada.  That compares to 1.7% of Americans, 2.6% of Chinese citizens, 3.3% of French citizens, 4.3% of Australians, 9% of British citizens, and 21.9% of New Zealanders.

In past decades, most Canadians leaving the country have moved to the United States.  In the 1980s, Los Angeles had the fourth largest Canadian population of any city in North America, with New York close behind.  Other countries and cities have emerged as major sites of Canadian settlement, notably Hong Kong, London, Beirut, Sydney, Paris, and Dubai.  The population in New York experienced continued growth in the 2000s, doubling between 2000 and 2008 to 21,000, representing the eighth largest foreign-born group in the Borough of Manhattan.

A 2008 report by the Urban Institute estimated that "65,000 and 75,000 undocumented Canadians currently live in the United States."

The largest Canadian populations abroad by country are: 

Citizens born in Canada make up about 58% of the diaspora, the other 42% being people born outside Canada who became naturalized as Canadian citizens and then moved out again, often back to their country of origin, or sometimes to a third country.  Native-born Canadians had an exit rate of about 1.33% over ten years from 1996 to 2006, compared to 4.5% for naturalized Canadians.  Most Canadians in the United States are native-born, while most Canadians in Hong Kong are naturalized Canadians who were born in Hong Kong.

For native-born Canadians, the United States is the primary destination, and the emigration rate varies substantially by ethnicity.  It is especially high among Middle Eastern, Eastern European, and South Asian Canadians, indicating that the English-speaking and well-educated children of immigrants are often highly mobile.  French Canadians have the highest rate of return to Canada at 29%. Among naturalized Canadians, exit rates vary by country of origin, being highest among Canadians from typically highly developed countries (Hong Kong, United States, Taiwan, France).  Exit rates among Canada's two largest immigrant populations, Mainland Chinese and Indians, were very low during 1996 to 2006 but have risen.

British Columbians are particularly likely to go overseas, more than twice as likely as an Ontarian, and five times more likely as a Quebecer, according to a 2007 survey by The Vancouver Sun.  Many of these are Hong Kong returnees; the so-called "astronauts" or "yacht people" who moved to Vancouver from Hong Kong in the 1980s and 90s, but later returned.  However, two-thirds of Canadians overseas (in 2007) were Canadian-born, outnumbering returning immigrants.

References 
 
 
 

 
Society of Canada